Shiraoi Hachiman Shrine (白老八幡神社, Shiraoi Hachiman jinja) is a Shinto shrine located in Shiraoi, Hokkaido at 白老郡白老町本町1丁目1番11号. It is a Hachiman shrine, dedicated to the kami Hachiman, and its annual festival is on September 15. In addition to Hachiman, it enshrines Emperor Ōjin (応神天皇, Ōjin-tennō), also known as Hondawake no Mikoto (誉田別尊).

See also
Hachiman shrine
List of Shinto shrines in Hokkaidō

External links
Official website
Hokkaido Shinto website listing

Shinto shrines in Hokkaido
Hachiman shrines